Anthony Glenn Buzbee is an American lawyer and politician. In 2019, Buzbee ran for mayor of Houston, Texas, but lost to incumbent Sylvester Turner.

Early life and education

Buzbee grew up in Atlanta, Texas, on a farm with his parents and three siblings. Buzbee earned a B.S. in Psychology from Texas A&M University and a J.D. from the University of Houston Law Center. Buzbee was the Battalion Commander of the NROTC Midshipman Battalion and a member of the Texas A&M Corps of Cadets. The Buzbee Leadership Learning Center on the Quadrangle is named in his honor.

Career

He began his legal career as an attorney at Susman Godfrey LLP in Houston. In 2000, he founded the Buzbee Law Firm.

Buzbee appeared on the cover of The New York Times magazine in November 2010 regarding his role in the litigation against BP following the Deepwater Horizon oil spill in the Gulf of Mexico. The article described him as "one of the most successful trial lawyers in Texas". As of April 6, 2021, Buzbee represents at least twenty-one clients alleging sexual misconduct against NFL	Quarterback Deshaun Watson.  In 2021, Buzbee filed a $750 million lawsuit against rapper Travis Scott on behalf of 120 victims who died or were injured during the Astroworld Festival crowd crush.

Buzbee is also a property developer. He owns Buzbee Properties, a real-estate firm focused on various suburbs in the Greater Houston area. He also owns some properties in Florida.

Politics

In 2002, Buzbee unsuccessfully ran for the 24th District of the Texas State House as a Democrat, losing to Republican Larry Taylor by 17 points. From August 2003 to April 2005, Buzbee was chair of the Galveston County Democratic Party.

In 2012, Buzbee supported Rick Perry's presidential campaign with financial support and the use of his private jet. Buzbee also served as one of Perry's debate coaches. In 2016, Buzbee hosted a fundraiser at his River Oaks mansion for then presidential candidate Donald Trump. Later on, following the release of the Access Hollywood tape, Buzbee disavowed Trump and stated his intention to write-in veteran Dan Moran for president. Subsequently, Buzbee gave $500,000 to Trump's inauguration committee.

Houston mayoral run
On October 30, 2018, Buzbee announced he would be running in the 2019 Houston mayoral election, challenging incumbent Houston Mayor, Sylvester Turner, on a platform of universal pre-K, infrastructure improvement, crime reduction, and expanding access to 5G broadband. Following the November 5, 2019, election Buzbee garnered 28% of the vote, enough to make it into a runoff with Turner who had 47% of the vote in unofficial returns. Buzbee lost to Turner in the runoff election.

Personal life

Buzbee married Zoe Benson in 1991 and they have four children together. Buzbee and Benson divorced in 2017. Buzbee became engaged to Frances Moody in 2020.

In March 2016, Buzbee was arrested in Harris County on suspicion for driving while intoxicated. In December of the same year, the Harris County District Attorney, Devon Anderson, personally dismissed the case. Controversy ensued when it was revealed that Buzbee completed the year-long probation program in only eight months and had contributed to Anderson's election campaign in 2014.

References

1968 births
Living people
Texas A&M University alumni
Texas lawyers
University of Houston Law Center alumni